Yao Leeh-ter is a Taiwanese engineer and politician. He was appointed political deputy minister of Education in September 2017 and resigned the position in January 2019.

Education
Yao obtained his diploma in electrical engineering from National Taipei Institute of Technology in 1982. He then moved to the United States and obtained master's degree in electrical engineering from Missouri University of Science and Technology in 1987 and doctoral degree in electrical and computer engineering from University of Wisconsin–Madison in 1992.

See also
 Education in Taiwan

References

Living people
Taiwanese Ministers of Education
Year of birth missing (living people)
Missouri University of Science and Technology alumni